Kopanets is a rural locality (a khutor) in Alexeyevsky District, Belgorod Oblast, Russia. The population was 190 as of 2010. There are 3 streets.

Geography 
Kopanets is located 25 km southeast of Alexeyevka (the district's administrative centre) by road. Shkuropatov is the nearest rural locality.

References 

Rural localities in Alexeyevsky District, Belgorod Oblast
Biryuchensky Uyezd